The Swan 131 was designed by German Frers and Nautor's Swan with only one built and "Aristarchos" was launched in 2006 it is the largest boat produced to date by the yard.

External links
 Nautor Swan
 German Frers Official Website

References

Sailing yachts
Keelboats
2000s sailboat type designs
Sailboat types built by Nautor Swan
Sailboat type designs by Germán Frers